Dorcadion cineriferum is a species of beetle in the family Cerambycidae. It was described by Suvorov in 1909. It is known from the Caucasus.

References

cineriferum
Beetles described in 1909